Christophe Laborie (born 5 August 1986 in Aurillac) is a French former professional cyclist, who competed professionally between 2011 and 2016 for the ,  and  teams.

Major results

2009
 1st Stage 3 Mi-Août Bretonne
2010
 6th Overall Tour de Gironde
 10th Val d'Ille Classic
2011
 4th Clásica de Almería
2012
 6th Grand Prix Pino Cerami
 10th Flèche d'Emeraude
2014
 6th Route Adélie
2015
 4th Route Adélie

References

External links

1986 births
Living people
French male cyclists
People from Aurillac
Sportspeople from Cantal
Cyclists from Auvergne-Rhône-Alpes